Peters Brook is a tributary of the Raritan River that flows south through Bridgewater Township and Somerville, New Jersey, in the United States. Some of its tributaries include Ross Brook and Mac's Brook.

Peters Brook is approximately six miles long, beginning near the west side of I-287 and emptying into the Raritan River south of Somerville.

The Brook is named for Peter Van Nest, son of Dutch immigrant Pieter Van Nest.  The homestead of the Van Nest family was in nearby Raritan near Glaser Avenue.  Peter Van Nest fought in the American Revolutionary War under Jacob Ten Eyck's command.

Peters Brook is notable for having high phosphate levels and flooding, receiving large amounts of stormwater.

Peters Brook Greenway
A 1.5-mile-long gravel pathway in Somerville traces the course of the brook through the borough. The trail is about eight feet wide and runs from Mountain Avenue to High Street.  The brook also traverses Flockhart Park, which is accessible from US-202 South in Bridgewater right before the Somerset Shopping Center and Somerville Circle exit.  Flockhart Park was named after former Somerville Mayor Thomas Flockhart.

Crossings

In Bridgewater
Talamini Road
Garretson Road
Somerset Corporate Boulevard
 US 22
 US 202

In Somerville
Mountain Avenue
Mercer Street
Davenport Street
North Bridge Street
Grove Street
East Cliff Street
East High Street (1911)
 East Main Street
South Side Avenue

See also
List of rivers of New Jersey

References

External links
Gage at Mercer Street, Somerville, NJ
Project on Peter's Brook

Tributaries of the Raritan River
Rivers of New Jersey
Rivers of Somerset County, New Jersey